Ysbyty Gwynedd is a district general hospital in Bangor, Gwynedd, Wales. It is managed by Betsi Cadwaladr University Health Board.

History
The hospital, which was commissioned to replace the aging Caernarfon and Anglesey Infirmary, opened in May 1984. A specialist cancer centre opened at the hospital in September 2010 and a major expansion of the accident and emergency facilities was completed in 2019.

Radio Ysbyty Gwynedd
The Radio Ysbyty Gwynedd hospital radio was named "station of the year" at the Hospital Radio Associations 2022 awards, and won a digital radio award at the 2022 Community Radio Awards.

References

NHS hospitals in Wales
Hospitals established in 1984
Hospital buildings completed in 1984
Hospitals in Gwynedd
Betsi Cadwaladr University Health Board